Jorma Lehtelä (born 14 February 1963) is a Finnish rower. He competed in the men's double sculls event at the 1988 Summer Olympics.

References

External links
 

1963 births
Living people
Finnish male rowers
Olympic rowers of Finland
Rowers at the 1988 Summer Olympics
People from Valkeakoski
Sportspeople from Pirkanmaa